This is a list of German states by fertility rate as of 2020 according to the Federal Statistical Office of Germany.

References

External links 
 Federal Statistical Office
Germany, Fertility rate
Fertility rate
Fertility